The Codex Corbeiensis I, designated by ff1 or 9 (in the Beuron system), is an 8th, 9th, or 10th-century Latin New Testament manuscript. The text, written on vellum, is a version of the old Latin. The manuscript contains 39 parchment folios with the text of the four Gospels, Acts of the Apostles, and General epistles.

Text 

The Latin text of the  Gospel of Matthew of the codex is representative of the Old Latin text in Itala recension. The text of the rest of books of New Testament is predominantly Vulgate text.

Verse Matthew 12:47 is omitted as in codices Codex Sinaiticus, Vaticanus, Codex Regius, 1009, Lectionary 12, k, syrc, syrs, copsa.

In Matthew 16:12 it has textual variant της ζυμης των αρτων των Φαρισαιων και Σαδδουκαιων (leaven of bread of the Pharisees and Sadducee's) supported only by Codex Sinaiticus and Curetonian Gospels.

History 

The manuscript formerly belonged to the monastic Library of Corbie Abbey, on the Somme, near Amiens; and with the most important part of that Library was transferred to the St. Germain des Prés at Paris, about the year 1638, and was there numbered 21. 
The St. Germain Library was suffered severely during the French Revolution, and Peter Dubrowsky, Secretary to the Russian Embassy at Paris acquired some of manuscripts stolen from the public libraries. It was transferred to the Imperial Library at. St. Petersburg about 1800-1805. It was edited by J. Martianay in 1695 (Vulgata antiqua Latina et versio Evangelii secundum Matthaeum, Paris 1695), Sabatier, Bianchini, Belsheim, Calmet, Migne, and Jülicher.

Currently it is housed at the National Library of Russia (Ov. 3, D. 326) at Saint Petersburg.

See also 

 List of New Testament Latin manuscripts
 Codex Corbeiensis II

References

Further reading 

 Augustine Calmet, Commentarius literalis in omnes libros Novi Testamenti Latinis litteris  traditus a Ioanne Dominico Mansi, Würzburg, Vol. 2 (1787), p. 276-302. 
 Migne, Patrologia Latina, Vol. 12, Paris 1845.
 John Wordsworth, The Corbey St. James (ff), and its relation to other Latin versions, and to the original language of the Epistle, Studia Biblica (Oxford 1885), pp. 113–150. 
 A. Jülicher, Itala. Das Neue Testament in Altlateinischer Überlieferung, Walter de Gruyter, Berlin, New York, 1976. (Marcus Evangelium)
 

Vetus Latina New Testament manuscripts
8th-century biblical manuscripts